Vertical Expandable Prosthetic Titanium Ribs (VEPTR) is a product of Synthes for the treatment of childhood deformities of the thorax. It is a special form of a lengthenable rod ("Growing Rod"). An alternative system is the USS pediatric for older children, also from Synthes.

The instrument is used to dilate a too small or too narrow rib thorax in severe thoracic deformity. It consists of a telescopic "titanium rib" in curved form with several holes in a row for fixing in the desired length. A prolongation can be carried out after 6 months. The fixation takes place between two ribs or between a rib and the iliac crest. This results in an indirect erection of the deformed spine, resulting in an increase in the volume of the thoracic cavity along with the lung.

References

Surgical procedures and techniques